Kahrizak-e Burbur (also Romanized as Kahrīzak-e Būrbūr; also known as Kahrīzak) is a village in Behnamvasat-e Jonubi Rural District, Javadabad District, Varamin County, Tehran Province, Iran. At the 2006 census, its population was 13, in 5 families.

References 

Populated places in Varamin County